Brahim is a shorter form of Ibrahim, the Arabic name for Abraham. It may refer to:

Brahim (given name)
Brahim (surname)
Brahim (Pashtun tribe), a tribe in Afghanistan
Stage name of Brahim Attaeb, Belgian-Moroccan singer
Stage name of Brahim Mahrez, French-Algerian singer
Brahim (film), a 1957 Moroccan film; see

See also
Sidi Brahim (disambiguation)
Abraham (disambiguation)
Ibrahim (disambiguation)